Malonyl-CoA O-methyltransferase (BioC) is an enzyme with systematic name S-adenosyl-L-methionine:malonyl-CoA O-methyltransferase. This enzyme catalyses the following chemical reaction

 S-adenosyl-L-methionine + malonyl-CoA  S-adenosyl-L-homocysteine + malonyl-CoA methyl ester

Malonyl-CoA O-methyltransferase is involved in an early step of biotin biosynthesis in Gram-negative bacteria.

References

External links 

EC 2.1.1